Kathryn Alexandre is a Canadian actress. She was the acting double for Tatiana Maslany in the BBC America/Space show Orphan Black and acts as all eleven of the roles of clones opposite Maslany. She does not appear in the clone roles in the aired episodes since motion control cameras and post-production compositing are used to replace her with Maslany's performances. However, Alexandre does appear on camera in another role as Alexis in the series.
She graduated from the Theatre & Drama program at the University of Toronto Mississauga and Sheridan College in 2011.

Filmography

References

External links 

Kathryn Alexandre on Instagram

Living people
21st-century Canadian actresses
Canadian television actresses
Canadian film actresses
University of Toronto alumni
Orphan Black
Year of birth missing (living people)